The Bronwydd Arms television relay station is sited on high ground to the west of the village of Bronwydd to the north of Carmarthen. It was originally built in mid 1989 as a fill-in relay for UHF analogue colour television covering the village of Bronwydd Arms and the surrounding community. It consists of a 14 m wooden telegraph pole standing on a hillside which is itself about 85 m above sea level. The transmissions are beamed east to cover the target. The Bronwydd Arms transmission station is owned and operated by Arqiva.

Bronwydd Arms transmitter re-radiates the signal received off-air from Carmel about 30 km to the southeast. When it came, the digital switchover process for Bronwydd Arms duplicated the timing at Carmel with the first stage taking place on 26 August 2009 and with the second stage being completed on 23 September 2009. After the switchover process, analogue channels had ceased broadcasting permanently and the Freeview digital TV services were radiated at an ERP of 2 W each.

Channels listed by frequency

Analogue television

5 June 1989 - 26 August 2009
Bronwydd Arms entered service on the same day as did the nearby repeater at Cynwyl Elfed.
Being in Wales, both transmitted the S4C variant of Channel 4.

Analogue and digital television

26 August 2009 - 23 September 2009
The UK's digital switchover commenced at Carmel (and therefore at Bronwydd Arms and all its other relays) on 26 August 2009. Analogue BBC Two Wales on channel 27 was first to close, replaced by the new digital BBC A mux which started up in 64-QAM and at full power (i.e. 2 W) on that same channel.

Digital television

23 September 2009 - present
The remaining analogue TV services were closed down and the digital multiplexes took over on the original analogue channels' frequencies.

References

External links
The Transmission Gallery: Bronwydd Arms

Transmitter sites in Wales
Carmel UHF 625-line Transmitter Group